The Gold Standard Act was an Act of the United States Congress, signed by President William McKinley and effective on March 14, 1900, defining the United States dollar by gold weight and requiring the United States Treasury to redeem, on demand and in gold coin only, paper currency the Act specified.

The Act formalized the American gold standard that the Coinage Act of 1873, which demonetized silver, had established by default.  Before and after the Act, silver currency including silver certificates and the silver dollar circulated at face value as fiat currency not redeemable for gold.

The Act fixed the value of one dollar at 25.8 grains of 90% pure gold, equivalent to about $20.67 per troy ounce, very near its historic value. American circulating gold coins of the period comprised an alloy of 90% gold and 10% copper for durability.

After the realigning election of 1932 following the onset of the Great Depression, from March 1933 the gold standard was abandoned, and the Act abrogated, by a coordinated series of policy changes including executive orders by President Franklin D. Roosevelt, new laws, and controversial Supreme Court rulings.

After World War II international agreements comprising the Bretton Woods system formally restored foreign central banks' ability to exchange United States dollars for gold at a fixed price.  World trade growth increasingly stressed this system, which was abandoned in the Nixon shock of 1971.  Attempts to reform the Bretton Woods system quickly proved unworkable and failed.  All modern currencies thus became fiat currencies freely floating and subject to market forces despite capital controls imposed by some central banks, with gold as a commodity.

See also

 Double eagle, one of a variety of U.S. gold coins minted in dollar units at $20.67/ounce
 Gold standard
 Specie Payment Resumption Act
 Bland–Allison Act
 Sherman Silver Purchase Act

References

Further reading

External links
Gold Standard Act (text of the Act)
Gold Standard Act of 1900 (discussion)

United States federal currency legislation
1900 in American law
Gold legislation
1900 in economics
Gold in the United States